Nirjan Bhadra (born 5 June 1994) is a Bangladeshi cricketer. He made his List A debut for Khelaghar Samaj Kallyan Samity in the 2017–18 Dhaka Premier Division Cricket League on 27 March 2018.

References

External links
 

1994 births
Living people
Bangladeshi cricketers
Khelaghar Samaj Kallyan Samity cricketers
People from Satkhira District